Richard Peter Davies (born 15 May 1990) in Willenhall, England) is an English professional footballer who plays for Chasetown F.C.

Career

Walsall

He made his Walsall debut on 27 January 2009 in the Football League One clash with Swindon Town at the County Ground, which ended in a 3–2 loss. He was released by Walsall on 10 May 2010 along with six other players

AFC Telford United

He joined AFC Telford in 2010 after he got released from Walsall FC. He went on loan to Chasetown FC shortly after. After spending a season long loan at Chasetown FC he got recalled for the play off semi-final against Nuneaton Town which they won. Following his good performance in that game he became a first team player for the Bucks. He became a key player for AFC Telford in the Blue Square Prem.

Barrow
In June 2013 he joined Barrow AFC in the Conference North after his contract was not renewed at Telford.

Career statistics

Personal life

He is the younger brother of current Bolton Wanderers midfielder Mark Davies.

References

External links

1990 births
Living people
English footballers
Association football midfielders
Walsall F.C. players
Solihull Moors F.C. players
AFC Telford United players
Chasetown F.C. players
Barrow A.F.C. players
English Football League players
National League (English football) players